Rhum can mean:

Rùm, a Scottish island also known as "Rhum"
Rhum agricole, French for sugarcane juice rum
 island class ferry
Rhum gasfield, North Sea, UK sector
Rhum (actor), in the French short film Gai dimanche

See also
 Rhumb (disambiguation)